The Iraqi passport is a passport document issued to citizens of Iraq, including the country’s autonomous Kurdistan region, for international travel. The new "A" series of passports began circulating on 1 February 2010, as a result of Iraqi governmental initiatives to create a more secure Iraqi passport. As of 6 March 2023 a 3rd generation electronic passport, approved by the International Civil Aviation Organization (ICAO), has begun circulating in order to make travel more accessible by shortening about 85 percent of the paperwork and the administrative procedures, and will be issued to citizens within one day. Previous series issued by passport offices in Iraq and diplomatic representatives worldwide include the "S" non-machine-readable series, and the "G" series.

History
The new A-series passports have been issued since 1 October 2009 (German embassy in Jordan, 2009). Passports in the G-series are thus no longer issued, but they are still valid until their expiry date. However, in autumn 2014, a document expert at a Western embassy in Amman informed Landinfo (meeting in Amman, November 2014) that the Iraqi authorities were still issuing G-series passports. This means that real G-series passports issued after 2009 may be in circulation. A-series passports differ from G-series passports in that they contain text in Arabic, Kurdish and English. There is also a difference on the page containing personal data – G-series passports have a field for the passport holder’s signature or fingerprints, while in A-series passports, this field has been replaced by a bar code. The page containing biometric data is laminated, as it was in the G-series. The passport holder’s signature is on page 3 in the passport. A-series passports have 48 pages and are valid for eight years. The passport number is perforated through the bottom of each page starting from page 3. Pages 4–48 are visa pages. All A-series passports are personal. Children must have their own passport.

Passport types
There are four different passport types.

Regular passport (dark blue cover) – Issued to all citizens of the Republic of Iraq. It is valid for four or eight years depending on the age of the passport applicant/holder. Those passports are not extendable or renewable and a new one must be obtained once expired.
Diplomatic passport (ruby cover) – Issued to Iraqi diplomats accredited overseas and their eligible dependents, and to citizens who reside in the Republic of Iraq and travel abroad for diplomatic work. Title and function of the bearer (diplomat) is listed on the data page of the Diplomatic Passport in addition to the information already contained. It is valid for five years.
Service passport (dark red cover) – Issued to citizen-employees of the Republic of Iraq assigned overseas, Iraqi Government employees working at the Ministry of Foreign Affairs or at the Iraqi Diplomatic Mission assigned abroad. Official Passports can be issued to other government officials that are to travel abroad, with prior approval, as well as to their spouses and children living in the same household. Title and function of the bearer (official) is listed on the data page of the Official Passport in addition to the information already contained. It is valid for five years.
Special passport (dark green cover) – Is issued to an Iraqi Citizen who needs to come back into Iraq; when issued it is valid for thirty days or until the return trip is completed and can be issued at an Iraqi Diplomatic Mission.

Passport Series

Physical appearance

Languages
The new A-series passports differ from G-series passports in that they contain text in Arabic, Kurdish and English. There is also a difference on the page containing personal data – G-series passports have a field for the passport holder’s signature or fingerprints, while in A-series passports, this field has been replaced by a bar code

Identity Information page
The front page of the Iraqi passport includes the following data:
 Photo of passport owner
 Type of document (P = passport)
 Code for issuing country (IRQ = Iraq)
 Passport number (9 alphanumeric digits, chosen from numerals 0–9 and letters C, F, G, H, J, K, L, M, N, P, R, T, V, W, X, Y, Z. Thus, "0" denotes the numeral, not the letter "O".)
 Full Name
 Surname 
 Date of birth 
 Sex 
 Nationality 
 Place of birth 
 Date of issue 
 Date of expiry 
 Authority that issued the passport 
 Owner's signature

The page ends with a 2-line machine readable zone, according to ICAO standard 9303. The country code is IRQ as is the standard country code for Iraq (according to ISO 3166-1 alpha-3).

Visa Requirements

On January 18, 2018, Iraqi citizens had visa-free or visa on arrival access to 28 countries and territories, ranking the Iraqi passport 104th in the world according to the Visa Restrictions Index.

Gallery of historic images

See also
 Visa policy of Iraq
 Visa requirements for Iraqi citizens
 Iraqi nationality law
 Iraq National Card

References

Passports by country
Government of Iraq